Bathurst Street may refer to:
Bathurst Street, Hobart
Bathurst Street, Sydney
Bathurst Street (Toronto)